Camp Greene was a United States Army facility in Charlotte, North Carolina, United States during the early 20th century. In 1917, both the 3rd Infantry Division and the 4th Infantry Divisions were first organized and assembled at this camp.

History

Named Camp Greene, after the Revolutionary War hero, Nathanael Greene. the camp was established at Charlotte, North Carolina in 1917.  At that time, the population of Charlotte was approaching its 1920 total of 46,000, and so was roughly equivalent to the 40,000 soldiers who trained at Camp Greene.

See also
 148th Field Artillery Regiment (United States)

References

 The Echo of the Bugle Call, Charlotte's Role in World War I by Miriam Grace Mitchell and Edward Spaulding Perzel

External links
 https://web.archive.org/web/20150925111655/http://www.cmstory.org/doughboys/
 https://web.archive.org/web/20040202193904/http://campgreene.org/  Domain Now owned by neighborhood organization with small bit of history
 http://ncpedia.org/wwi-boot-camp-charlotte More detailed history
 [https://uncc.primo.exlibrisgroup.com/discovery/fulldisplay?docid=alma991009784829704091&context=L&vid=01UNCC_INST:01UNCC_INST&lang=en
 Jack Dillard collection of Camp Greene photographs 1917], J. Murrey Atkins Library, UNC Charlotte 

Military installations in North Carolina